Vilma Vaattovaara (born 10 March 1993) is a Finnish retired ice hockey goaltender and former member of the Finnish national team, currently serving as goaltending coach with the Streatham Youth Ice Hockey Club, the youth affiliate of Streatham IHC. Her coaching oversight includes the Streatham Black Hawks in the Division II of the National Ice Hockey League (NIHL) in addition to the club's minor and junior teams. Representing Finland, she won a bronze medal at the 2015 IIHF Women's World Championship.

Playing career

Vaattovaara played college ice hockey with the New Hampshire Wildcats women's ice hockey program in the Hockey East (HEA) conference of the NCAA Division I during 2012 to 2016, and with the London Dragons C of the British Universities Ice Hockey Association (BUIHA) in 2018–19. In her native Finland, she played in the Naisten Liiga with the Tampereen Ilves Naiset and HPK Kiekkonaiset, with whom she won the Aurora Borealis Cup in 2011; she recorded the league's best goals against average and save percentage in the 2010–11, 2011–12, and 2017–18 seasons.

Personal life
Vaattovaara has a BSc in zoology/pre-veterinary medicine from the University of New Hampshire and is  a veterinary student at the Royal Veterinary College of the University of London. 

, she is the logistics head for the independently operated University of London Dragons organisation, which manages the various London Dragons ice hockey teams in the BUIHA. 

Her siblings also played ice hockey – her elder brother, Ville, was a goaltender in the Finnish junior leagues and her younger sister, Viivi, was a defenseman in the Naisten Liiga and played four years of NCAA hockey, one Division I season with the UConn Huskies and three Division III seasons with the Buffalo State Bengals.

References

External links
 

1993 births
Living people
Finnish women's ice hockey goaltenders
New Hampshire Wildcats women's ice hockey players
HPK Kiekkonaiset players
Ilves Naiset players
Finnish ice hockey coaches
Finnish expatriate ice hockey players in the United States
Finnish expatriate ice hockey players in England
Finnish expatriate ice hockey coaches in England
Alumni of the Royal Veterinary College